Tony Kendall may refer to:

Tony Kendall (poker player) (born 1947), English poker player
Tony Kendall (actor) (1936–2009), Italian model and actor